Angelica sylvestris or wild angelica is a species of flowering plant, native to Europe and central Asia.

Habitat and ecology
The Latin specific epithet sylvestris means “growing in woodland”. However it tolerates a range of conditions including fields, hedgerows, open woods, marshes and fens. It will grow in light (sandy), medium (loamy) and heavy (clay) soils.

It has recently been determined to be an invasive weed in New Brunswick and Cape Breton, Nova Scotia, Canada. "According to the New Brunswick Invasive Species Council, unless this species is controlled, Woodland Angelica could spread throughout Canada, overwhelming other vegetation." The flowers are visited by a wide array of insects and are thus characterised by a generalised pollination system.

Adult wasps of Dolichovespula norwegica are known to feed off the nectar provided by A. sylvestris.

Cultivation and uses
A. sylvestris is cultivated in gardens. The cultivar 'Ebony', with pink flowers, has gained the Royal Horticultural Society’s Award of Garden Merit.

It was used as a vegetable until the 20th century. The plant can be stored. The stem was eaten fresh, and the leaves could be boiled to a stew for storage or cooked with milk. The plant has also been used for dyeing.

Gallery

References

sylvestris
Plants described in 1753
Plant dyes
Taxa named by Carl Linnaeus